Total Evaporation is the fifth album by the Radiators, released in 1991. The band and label parted ways before the year was over. Total Evaporation sold more than 85,000 copies in its first six months of release.

"Let the Red Wine Flow" was the first single. The band supported the album with a North American tour.

Production
Recorded in Memphis, the album was produced by Jim Dickinson. Most of the songs were written by Ed Volker; he thought that the album incorporated a more pronounced soul influence. The Memphis Horns played on a few tracks.

Critical reception

USA Today praised the "funk-bitten Mardi Gras stomp." The Chicago Tribune wrote that "the band has yet to kick the homily habit or its reliance on funky rock retreads straight out of Little Feat and the Neville Brothers." The Waterloo Region Record opined that, "as a kind of roots-rock with country tinges, this album has too many competitors to make it worthwhile." The Houston Chronicle deemed the Radiators a "quintessential bar band," writing that the majority of the album was the "usual funky-blues flow." The Oregonian noted that the "relaxed arrangements ... avoid the beer-commercial-boogie cliches."

Track listing
 "Soul Deep" (Ed Volker) — 4:34
 "Let the Red Wine Flow" (Volker, Dave Malone, Camile Baudoin) — 4:53
 "Total Evaporation" (Volker, Malone, Baudoin, Reggie Scanlan) — 5:33
 "Grain of Salt" (Volker) — 3:46
 "Molasses" (Malone, Volker) — 3:43
 "Solid Ground" (Volker) — 6:03
 "Never Let Your Fire Go Out" (Malone, Baudoin, Scanlan, Frank Bua) — 3:40
 "Everything Gets in the Way" (Volker) — 4:02
 "You Can't Take It with You" (Malone, Baudoin, Scanlan, Bua) — 5:06
 "Good as Gone" (Volker) — 4:31
 "Party 'Til the Money Runs Out" (Volker) — 2:09
 "Honey from the Bee" (Volker) — 3:58
 "I Want to Go Where the Green Arrow Goes" (Volker) — 5:25

Personnel

 Ed Volker – keyboards, vocals
 Dave Malone – guitars, vocals
 Camile Baudoin – guitars, vocals
 Reggie Scanlan – bass
 Frank Bua Jr. – drums
 Glenn Sears – percussion
 Jim Dickinson – producer
 East Memphis Slim – Hammond organ
 Wayne Jackson – trombone, trumpet
 Andrew Love – tenor saxophone
 The Memphis Horns
 Jay Mark – engineer

References

The Radiators (American band) albums
1991 albums
Epic Records albums
Albums produced by Jim Dickinson